Piotr Pawlicki Sr. (born 29 July 1963) is a former motorcycle speedway rider from Poland.

Career 
Pawlicki Sr. came to prominence in 1983, when he won the Polish Junior Individual Speedway Championship.

He won a bronze medal in the prestigious Golden Helmet during the 1991 Polish speedway season.

He spent his entire career riding for his nearby home club of Unia Leszno, where he won three Polish league championships. He retired after suffering serious lumbar vertebrae and spinal cord injuries during the 1992 Polish Pairs Speedway Championship.

Family
Both of his sons Piotr Pawlicki Jr. and Przemysław Pawlicki were professional speedway riders.

References 

1963 births
Polish speedway riders